Fjørtofta is an island in Ålesund Municipality in Møre og Romsdal county, Norway. The  island is located in the northern part of the municipality, between the islands of Flemsøya, Harøya, and Midøya and Dryna (both in Molde Municipality).

Agriculture and fishing are the main industries on the island. Fjørtoft Church is located on the northern part of the island. In 2015, there were 136 residents of the island.

The island has ferry connections to the village of Brattvåg (on the mainland) and to the village of Myklebost (on Harøya island). The new Nordøyvegen bridge and tunnel project will connect the island of Fjørtofta to the mainland and its neighboring islands when it is completed in 2022.

See also
List of islands of Norway

References

Ålesund
Islands of Møre og Romsdal